Stuart Howarth (born 25 January 1990) is an English professional rugby league footballer who plays as a  or  for the Rochdale Hornets in Betfred League 1.

He has played for Wigan Warriors (academy), Blackpool Panthers (loan), Wakefield Trinity Wildcats (two spells), Salford City Reds, St. Helens (loan), Barrow Raiders (loan), Hull FC, Doncaster (loan), Bradford Bulls (loan) and Workington Town.

He has played for Hull FC and Salford City Reds, who loaned him to St. Helens.

After rugby
It was announced on 16 April 2021 that Stuart had taken an appointment as a science teacher at St Peter's Catholic High School in Orrell, after retiring from rugby and qualifying as a teacher.

References

External links
Whitehaven profile
Wakefield Trinity profile
Saints Heritage Society profile

1990 births
Living people
Barrow Raiders players
Blackpool Panthers players
Bradford Bulls players
Doncaster R.L.F.C. players
English rugby league players
Hull F.C. players
Rochdale Hornets players
Rugby league five-eighths
Rugby league halfbacks
Rugby league hookers
Rugby league locks
Rugby league second-rows
Salford Red Devils players
St Helens R.F.C. players
Wakefield Trinity players
Whitehaven R.L.F.C. players
Wigan Warriors players
Workington Town players